The Japanese city of Tokyo has two official emblems: the monshō ("crest") and the shinboru ("symbol"). The crest is a six-rayed stylized sun with a dot in the center, while the symbol is a stylised Ginkgo biloba leaf.

The city has two official flags, featuring each emblem.

Metropolitan crest 
It is same as the crest of the former Tokyo City, decided by the city council in December 1889.

The crest shows a six-rayed sun (which, as a red-filled circle without rays or a dot, is in the center of the national flag of Japan), with a dot in the center representing Tokyo as the metaphorical center of Japan. As with most other prefectural crests in Japan, its color is not designated. The crest can also be interpreted as a version of the kanji 京 (kyō) of 東京 (Tokyo), but the metropolitan announcement does not explain as such.

As a flag 

It features a white Metropolitan Crest on center. This shade of purple is one of the traditional colors of Japan, and is near identical to Web Indigo.

Metropolitan symbol

The vivid green symbol consists of three arcs combined to resemble a leaf of the ginkgo, the metropolitan tree, and represents T for Tokyo.

As a flag

It features a vivid green Metropolitan Symbol in its center. The background color is white.

Uses
Both emblems and their corresponding flags are the official insignias of Tokyo. The Metropolitan Crest and the Metropolitan Flag are older and are used on more formal occasions. They are also used on traditional or historical objects, as well as the things of the longer duration of use.

On the other hand, the Metropolitan Symbol and the Metropolitan Symbol Flag are more commonly used, including its official website, the metropolitan-operated buses and trains.

Gallery

See also
List of Japanese flags

References

External links
The Tokyo Metropolitan Government official website, including:
 都の紋章・花・木・鳥 (Metropolitan crest, flower, tree and bird)
 Tokyo's Symbols
 東京都例規集データベース (Tokyo Metropolis ordinance database)

Tokyo
Tokyo
Flags of cities
Tokyo